Kate Davidson is an economics news reporter.

Career
, she is a reporter covering business and economics for Oregon Public Broadcasting. Previously she was a contributor to American Public Media's radio program Marketplace.

Davidson covered the U.S. economy and the Federal Reserve for the Wall Street Journal from January 2015 to October 2021.

She previously held roles at Politico, American Banker, the Congressional Quarterly and the Concord Monitor.

Education
Davidson earned a Master's Degree from the University of California Berkeley and a Master's Degree from Columbia University.
At Columbia, she was a Knight-Bagehot Fellow in Economics and Business Journalism.  She earned her undergraduate degree at Boston University after transferring from Fordham University.

Awards
In 2021, she won the national Edward R. Murrow Award for her ongoing coverage of the economic impact of the COVID-19 pandemic entitled The pandemic's economic fallout in Oregon.

She won her first national Edward R. Murrow award for her 2005 National Public Radio documentary "Saints and Indians" about the experiences of Navajo children sent to live with white Mormon families across the West.

While studying at Columbia, she was a Knight-Bagehot Fellow in Economics and Business Journalism.

References

American women writers
American women journalists
Living people
Year of birth missing (living people)
NPR personalities
The Wall Street Journal people